The Municipality of Litija is a municipality in central Slovenia. The seat of the municipality is the town of Litija. The area is part of the traditional Upper and Lower Carniola regions. The entire municipality is now included in the Central Sava Statistical Region; until 2015 it was part of the Central Slovenia Statistical Region. The population of the municipality is just over 15,000.

Coat of arms
The municipal coat of arms shows the situla vase from Klenik (the Vače situla), the Sava River, and a boatman pushing his boat, known as a punt, across the Sava.

Settlements
In addition to the municipal seat of Litija, the municipality also includes the following settlements:

 Berinjek
 Bistrica
 Bitiče
 Boltija
 Borovak pri Polšniku
 Breg pri Litiji
 Brezje pri Kumpolju
 Brezovo
 Brglez
 Čateška Gora
 Čeplje
 Cirkuše
 Dobje
 Dobovica
 Dole pri Litiji
 Dolgo Brdo
 Gabrovka
 Gabrska Gora
 Gobnik
 Golišče
 Gorenje Jelenje
 Gornje Ravne
 Gradišče
 Hohovica
 Hude Ravne
 Javorje pri Gabrovki
 Jelenska Reber
 Jesenje
 Jevnica
 Ježevec
 Kal pri Dolah
 Kamni Vrh
 Kandrše
 Klanec pri Gabrovki
 Klenik
 Konj
 Konjšica
 Kresnice
 Kresniške Poljane
 Kresniški Vrh
 Kržišče pri Čatežu
 Kumpolje
 Laze pri Gobniku
 Laze pri Vačah
 Leše
 Ljubež v Lazih
 Lukovec
 Magolnik
 Mala Goba
 Mala Sela
 Mamolj
 Moravče pri Gabrovki
 Moravška Gora
 Nova Gora
 Okrog
 Pečice
 Podbukovje pri Vačah
 Podpeč pod Skalo
 Podšentjur
 Pogonik
 Polšnik
 Ponoviče
 Potok pri Vačah
 Prelesje
 Prevale
 Preveg
 Preženjske Njive
 Radgonica
 Ravne
 Renke
 Ribče
 Ržišče
 Sava
 Selce
 Širmanski Hrib
 Široka Set
 Slavina
 Slivna
 Sopota
 Spodnje Jelenje
 Spodnji Hotič
 Spodnji Log
 Stranski Vrh
 Strmec
 Suhadole
 Šumnik
 Tenetiše
 Tepe
 Tihaboj
 Tlaka
 Tolsti Vrh
 Vače
 Velika Goba
 Velika Preska
 Veliki Vrh pri Litiji
 Vernek
 Vodice pri Gabrovki
 Vovše
 Zagorica
 Zagozd
 Zapodje
 Zavrh
 Zglavnica
 Zgornja Jevnica
 Zgornji Hotič
 Zgornji Log

References

External links

 Municipality of Litija on Geopedia
 Municipality of Litija website 

 
Litija
Litija
1994 establishments in Slovenia